Shahchand Auliya Kamil Madrasa is a religious educational institute in Chittagong.

Location 
It is located in the Patiya Upazila of  Chittagong district. The madrasa is located in about 5 acres
of land.

History 
This madrasa as established in 1928. Its founder was Syed Nurul Huq Shah, and he
was the first principal of the madrasa.

Educational activities
The educational program is following the guidelines of Islamic University, Kushtia and Bangladesh Madrasa Education Board under the Government of the People's Republic of Bangladesh. Ebtedayee level of primary equivalent level is 5 years, Secondary and lower secondary equivalent submission and JDC level 5 years, Higher level level of Alim level 2 years, Bachelor equivalent Fazil level 3 years and postgraduate equivalent level 2 years with education in 17 categories.

Results 
In the Dakhil examination of the year 2017, this madrasa had the top results in the
upazila.

Gallery

References 

Schools in Bangladesh
Alia madrasas of Bangladesh